Decapodiformes is a superorder of Cephalopoda comprising all cephalopod species with ten limbs, specifically eight short arms and two long tentacles. It is hypothesized that the ancestral coleoid had five identical pairs of limbs, and that one branch of descendants evolved a modified arm pair IV to become the Decapodiformes, while another branch of descendants evolved and then eventually lost its arm pair II, becoming the Octopodiformes.

The Decapodiformes include:
Order Spirulida: ram's horn squid
Order Sepiida: cuttlefish, pygmy, bobtail and bottletail squid
Order Myopsida: coastal squid
Order Oegopsida: neritic squid

References

Further reading
  abstract

External links

The Taxonomicon: Superorder Decapodiformes

Coleoidea
Cenozoic cephalopods
Protostome superorders